Slovenská národná strana may refer to:

 Slovak National Party
 Slovak National Party (historical party)